Mairi may refer to:

Given name
Mairi or Màiri is a given name, a Scottish Gaelic form of Mary.

Notable people with this name include:
Mairi MacEwan, (born 2003) Scottish dancer from Aberdeen
Mairi Campbell, Scottish singer and musician
Mairi Chisholm (1896–1981), Scottish nurse and ambulance driver in the First World War 
Mairi Hedderwick (born 1939), Scottish illustrator and author
Màiri McAllan, Scottish politician and Member of the Scottish Parliament for Clydesdale
Màiri Anna Nic Leòid (English: Mary Anne Macleod), mother of 45th President of the United States Donald Trump

Other uses
Mairi, Bahia, municipality in Brazil

See also
Mhairi, variant of the given name
Mairu, creatures of Basque mythology

Scottish Gaelic-language given names